William Henry Perrin (1831–1903) was a convict transported to Western Australia, who later became one of the colony's ex-convict school teachers.

Born in the United Kingdom in 1831, Perrin was married with two children, and working as a grocer's clerk, when he was convicted of rape and sentenced to fifteen years' transportation.  He arrived in Western Australia on board the Palmerston in February 1861, and received his ticket of leave the following year.  He was employed by the Dempster family at their Wongamine farm, and later purchased a small block of land on the boundary of their estate.

In 1868, Perrin began teaching a small class of children there. He was officially appointed a government schoolmaster in 1871, and later that year he married Elizabeth Woolhouse. William Perrin ran his school for nearly thirty years, teaching his children and some of his grandchildren there. He eventually retired in 1899 or 1900, and died in 1903.

References

1831 births
1903 deaths
Convicts transported to Western Australia
Settlers of Western Australia
Australian schoolteachers